soil stabilizer may refer to:
 Soil cement, a mix of pulverized natural soil with small amount of Portland cement and water
 Cellular confinement, a honeycomb-like plastic soil stabilizer
 Soil stabilization, a way of improving the weight bearing capabilities of sub-soils, sands, and other waste materials
 Soil stabilizer (vehicle), a machine used to make soil cement